Simpson Clairmonte "Sammy" Guillen (24 September 1924 – 1 March 2013) was one of the few men to have played Test cricket for two countries. He played five Test matches for the West Indies and three for New Zealand in the 1950s, including New Zealand team's first victory, over the West Indies. He sealed the win by stumping Alf Valentine in what was his final Test.

Life
Born 24 September 1924 at Port of Spain, Trinidad and Tobago, Guillen came from a family of cricketers which include: Victor Guillen (Simpson's father, a Test umpire in the West Indies), Noel Guillen (Simpson's brother, whom the Queen's Park Oval's outdoor practice nets are named after), Jeffrey Guillen (a well-known real estate mogul who played cricket competitively throughout his teens and well into his 30s; Noel's son), Charles Guillen (a former player who played a major factor in the coaching of West Indies all-rounder Dwayne Bravo) and Justin Guillen, an all-rounder for Trinidad and Tobago. His grandson Logan van Beek plays for the Canterbury Wizards in cricket and for the Christchurch Cougars in the NBL. Internationally, he represents the Netherlands in cricket.

Simpson resided in Christchurch with his wife Val Guillen, a former wicketkeeper for the province of Canterbury women's team. In 2004 he published his memoirs, Calypso Kiwi.

On the death of Colin Snedden on 24 April 2011, Guillen became the oldest surviving New Zealand Test cricketer; he was also the second-oldest surviving West Indian Test cricketer. He died at Christchurch on 1 March 2013.

Soccer career
Guillen held the further rare distinction of also playing in the final of New Zealand's premier association football competition, the Chatham Cup, gaining a runners-up medal for Western AFC in 1954. Unsurprisingly for a wicket-keeper, his position in the Western side was goalkeeper.

See also
 List of cricketers who have played for more than one international team

References

External links
 
 Obituary by Bryan Davis

1924 births
2013 deaths
Canterbury cricketers
Dual international cricketers
New Zealand Test cricketers
New Zealand cricketers
Trinidad and Tobago cricketers
West Indies Test cricketers
Cricketers from Port of Spain
New Zealand people of Caribbean descent
Trinidad and Tobago emigrants to New Zealand
Wicket-keepers